Franklin Leonard Pope (2 December 1840 – 13 October 1895) was an American engineer, explorer, and inventor.

Biography
He was born in Great Barrington, Massachusetts in December 1840 , the son of Ebenezer Pope and Electra Wainwright. He was a telegrapher, electrical engineer, explorer, inventor, and patent attorney.

He was also a major contributor to the technological advances of the 19th century. He was one of the leaders of the explorations related to the Collins Overland Telegraph, otherwise known as the Russian American Telegraph.

After developing a system which tracked and printed the prices of gold and stocks, Pope partnered with Thomas Edison in 1869, forming the company Pope, Edison & Company Electrical Engineers, and invented a one-wire telegraph in 1870. This telegraph is now known as a stock ticker, and was widely used in large cities for exchange quotations.  Pope’s partnership with Edison ended shortly after it was formed.

Pope was awarded several patents for his work in railroad semaphore lock signal systems, the most important of which was his 1872 invention for the rail circuit for automatic control of the electric-block signal system, which was widely used by the major U.S. railways. Pope was president of the American Institute of Electrical Engineers from 1886 to 1887.

Pope was an editor of the magazine Electrical Engineer, and edited the electrical section of The Engineering Magazine. Pope also worked as a patent attorney for Western Union Telegraph Company, and was retained as an expert in many important patent suits.

Pope married Sarah Amelia Dickinson on 6 August 1873; they had four children, two daughters and two sons. His youngest child, Seth Willard Pope, died a few weeks after birth. 

Pope died at age 54 as a result of an accidental electrocution by 3000 volts in the basement of his home at 518 Main Street in Great Barrington. His home is now a Bed and Breakfast called the Wainwright Inn B&B.

Pope's publications 
 Modern Practice of the American Telegraph (1869)
 Modern Practice of the Electrical Telegraph (1871)
 The Life and Works of Joseph Henry (1879)
 The Western Boundary of Massachusetts: a study of Indian and Colonial Life (1886)
 Evolution of the Incandescent Lamp (1889)
 Genealogy of Thomas Pope (1608–1683) and Some of his Descendants (1888).

In Popular Culture

In the 2019 film The Current War,  Pope is portrayed by Stanley Townsend.

References

External links
 
 http://www.telegraph-history.org/pope/
 IEEE biography of Pope

1840 births
1895 deaths
People from Great Barrington, Massachusetts
Engineers from Massachusetts
American explorers
19th-century American inventors